Rohit Ritesh Sharma is a Fijian politician and former Member of the Parliament of Fiji for the FijiFirst Party. He is a former school teacher and radio announcer.

In June 2020 Sharma appeared in court charged with assaulting his wife. He was released on bail.

Sharma was not included on his party's list for the 2022 general election.

References

living people
Indian members of the Parliament of Fiji
FijiFirst politicians
Politicians from Labasa
Year of birth missing (living people)
Politicians from Macuata Province
Radio and television announcers
Fijian educators